Frank Richards (15 October 1863 – 29 July 1926) was an Australian cricketer. He played one first-class cricket match for Victoria in 1890.

See also
 List of Victoria first-class cricketers

References

External links
 

1863 births
1926 deaths
Australian cricketers
Victoria cricketers
People from Castlemaine, Victoria